Bebop is a type of jazz music

BeBop may also refer to:
Be-Bop?, a 1979 album by saxophonist Pepper Adams and drummer Barry Altschul
BeBopBeBopBeBopBeBop, a 1989 album by pianist Paul Bley
Love Bebop, a 2016 album by Misia
Bebop and Rocksteady, characters in Teenage Mutant Ninja Turtles
Bebop (software), BibTeX publisher
BeBop, the main ship from the animated series Cowboy Bebop